Earth crustal displacement or Earth crust displacement may refer to: 

Plate tectonics, scientific theory which describes the large scale motions of Earth's crust (lithosphere).
Fault (geology), fracture in Earth's crust where one side moves with respect to the other side.
Supercontinent cycle, the quasi-periodic aggregation and dispersal of Earth's continental crust.
Cataclysmic pole shift hypothesis, where the axis of rotation of a planet may have shifted or the crust may have shifted dramatically.

Earth's crust